Anita Zagaria (born 27 June 1954) is an Italian actress. She has appeared in more than eighty films and TV series since 1982.

Selected filmography

References

External links 

1954 births
Living people
Italian film actresses